Botox is a 2020 co-production film between Iran and Canada directed by Kaveh Mazaheri. It is starring by Sousan Parvar, Mahdokht Molaie, Soroush Saeedi, Morteza Khanjani and Mohsen Kiani. The film picked as the best feature at the 38th Torino Film Festival, alongside its co-written by Mazaheri and Sepinud Najian won the award for best screenplay.

Summary
The sisters Akram and Azar, both lie about their brother’s disappearance, telling everyone he fled to Germany. Day after day, the lie becomes bigger and more unmanageable, leading everyone to a dark and mysterious destiny.

Reception

Awards and nominations

References

External links
 

Iranian drama films
2020 films
Canadian drama films
Films about Iranian Canadians
2020s Canadian films